Zhestkov is a Russian surname. Notable people with the surname include:

Maksim Zhestkov (born 1993), Russian footballer
Oleg Zhestkov (born 1987), Russian sprint canoeist

Russian-language surnames